Adrian James "A.J." Croce (born September 28, 1971) is an American singer-songwriter. He is the son of Ingrid Croce and Jim Croce.

Biography

Croce was born in Bryn Mawr, Pennsylvania, on September 28, 1971. His father died in a plane crash eight days before the boy's second birthday, and he and his newly widowed mother had to move to San Diego, almost 3,000 miles from his native city, with the rest of his family. Two years later, he was temporarily blinded as a result of abuse from his mother’s boyfriend. He later regained sight in one eye. When he was 15, the house in which he had lived for most of his life burned down.

In 2018, his wife, Marlo Gordon Croce, died of a rare and sudden heart virus while he was in the midst of his own health scare. A.J. was left a single father to two children, a daughter, Camille, and a son, Elijah.

Musical career

Croce's first paying gig was at the age of 12, when he was paid $20 (worth $53.45 in 2019) to perform at a bar mitzvah party. By the age of 16, Croce was performing regularly at San Diego nightclubs as a sideman and band leader. Croce reflected, "I was into every kind of music... you might say I was unfocused, but I consider an eclectic taste in music to be the foundation of versatility." 
Ron Goldstein and Peter Baumann of Private Music signed Croce to his first recording contract, at age 19. He recorded two albums for Private Music: his self-titled debut, A. J. Croce, produced by T-Bone Burnett and John Simon; and That's Me in the Bar, produced by Jim Keltner, and featuring Ry Cooder and David Hidalgo. Croce is also the owner/operator of his own record label, Seedling Records.

Croce's third album, Fit to Serve, was recorded in Memphis and produced by Jim Gaines, who produced Van Morrison, Santana, and the Steve Miller Band. Croce then made a musical change with the release of his album Transit. He explained, "I had been playing blues-based music for a long time, and I was ready to try something new." Transit was compared by critics to the work of John Lennon, Elvis Costello, Bob Dylan, and Van Morrison. Glen Starkey of New Times labeled Croce "a song crafter of the first order".

Croce's next three albums were self-produced. Adrian James Croce (Croce's only pop-oriented album) was the only independently produced album of 2004 to chart in the Top 40 in America. In Europe it was on the charts for six months, tracking between songs by U2 and Coldplay. That same year Adrian James Croce won Best Pop album at the San Diego Music Awards. His 2006 album, Cantos, on his own label, Seedling Records, features Ben Harper. In 2009, his album Cage of Muses was released on Seedling, garnering a 4-star review from Rolling Stone magazine.

In 2013, Croce signed with Compass Records and released Twelve Tales. He recorded two songs with each of six producers in five U.S. cities throughout a yearlong period, simultaneously releasing one song per month exclusively on iTunes in 2013. The full album was released on CD and LP in 2014. The album's producers were 'Cowboy' Jack Clement, famous for his work with Elvis Presley and Johnny Cash; Rock n' Roll Hall of Famer Allen Toussaint, producer of Dr. John and Irma Thomas; Golden Globe-nominated Mitchell Froom, whose work includes Randy Newman and Crowded House; Grammy-winning engineer and producer Kevin Killen, who produced multiple albums by Elvis Costello; notable A&R executive and record producer Tony Berg, whose sessions have included Bob Dylan and Fiona Apple; and Greg Cohen, avant-garde bass player and producer, known for his work with Tom Waits. Croce co-wrote a few of the songs on Twelve Tales, including one song with songwriter Leon Russell. Croce's albums have appeared on eight radio charts, including AAA, Blues, College, Jazz, and Americana.

He has performed as an opening act for Carlos Santana, Rod Stewart, Aretha Franklin, Dr. John, Lyle Lovett, James Brown, B.B. King, Dave Matthews, Earth, Wind and Fire, and Ray Charles. Croce has sat in with many notable artists live, including Willie Nelson, Ben Harper, Ry Cooder, the Neville Brothers, Waylon Jennings, and David Hidalgo (Los Lobos). He has also performed on national television, on shows including The Tonight Show with Jay Leno, Late Show with David Letterman, Late Night with Conan O'Brien, The Today Show, Good Morning America, MTV, CNN, and Austin City Limits.

In 2013, Croce was asked to be a performer at TEDxLaJolla, an independently produced TED ("Ideas Worth Spreading") event, the organization that organizes annual events with speakers on groundbreaking advances in technology, entertainment, and design.

Discography
 A. J. Croce (Private Music, 1993)
 That's Me in the Bar (Private Music, 1995)
 Fit to Serve (1998)
 Transit (2000)
 Adrian James Croce (2004)
 Early On – The American Recordings 1993–1998 (2005)
 Cantos (2006)
 Cage of Muses  (2009)
 Twelve Tales  (2014)
 Just Like Medicine  (2017)
 By Request  (2021)

References
11. http://listeniowa.com/just-different-a-conversation-with-a-j-croce/

External links
A.J. Croce's father's (Jim Croce's) web site
Official web site of Croce's Restaurant & Jazz Bar 
A. J. Croce's web site

1971 births
Living people
American male singer-songwriters
American people of Italian descent
Jewish American songwriters
Musicians from Philadelphia
Musicians from San Diego
Compass Records artists
Private Music artists
Singer-songwriters from Pennsylvania
Singer-songwriters from California
21st-century American singers
21st-century American male singers
Ruf Records artists
21st-century American Jews